Bright Future may refer to:
 Bright Future (album), the third studio album by Japanese girl group Empire
 Bright Future (film), a 2003 Japanese drama film written and directed by Kiyoshi Kurosawa
 Bright Future (Iceland), an Icelandic liberal political party founded in 2012
 Bright Future (policy), an innovation policy introduced by the National government in New Zealand in 1999